Waarder is a village in the Dutch province of South Holland. It is a part of the former municipality of Reeuwijk, and lies about 5 km southwest of Woerden.

The village was first mentioned in 1108 as Werdere and means "(river) island". Waarder developed as a road on a silted river arm in the 12th century. The Dutch Reformed church is a single aisled cruciform church from the 16th century.

Waarder was a separate municipality until 1964, when it became part of Driebruggen, which became part of Reeuwijk in 1989. Since 2011 it is part of the municipality of Bodegraven-Reeuwijk.

Gallery

References

Bodegraven-Reeuwijk
Populated places in South Holland
Former municipalities of South Holland